Leander Paes and David Rikl were the two-time defending champions, but did not participate this year. Rikl was also the three-time defending champion, having won the title with Joshua Eagle in 2002.

František Čermák and Leoš Friedl won the title, defeating Michael Kohlmann and Rainer Schüttler in the final, 7–6(8–6), 7–6(13–11).

Seeds

Draw

Draw

External links
Draw

Swiss Open (tennis)
2005 ATP Tour
2005 Allianz Suisse Open Gstaad